Spring Ridge is an unincorporated community in Caddo Parish, Louisiana, United States. It is part of the Shreveport–Bossier City Metropolitan Statistical Area.

Notes

Populated places in Ark-La-Tex
Unincorporated communities in Caddo Parish, Louisiana
Unincorporated communities in Louisiana
Unincorporated communities in Shreveport – Bossier City metropolitan area